Manuel Polster (born 23 December 2002) is an Austrian professional footballer who plays as a winger for Austria Wien.

Career
Polster is a youth product of the Austrian clubs SV Langenzersdorf and AKA St. Pölten, before moving to the youth academy of the German club Wolfsburg in 2019. He moved to the Stuttgart reserves in the Regionalliga on 11 July 2022 and scored 6 goals in 34 matches. 

On 27 June 2022, Polster transferred to Austria Wien, signing a 3-year contract. He made his professional and Austrian Football Bundesliga with Austria Wien as a late substitute in a 3–0 win over Ried on 18 September 2021.

International career
Polster is a youth international for Austria, having played with them up to the Austria U18 level.

References

External links
 
 OEFB Profile
 DFB profile

2002 births
Living people
Footballers from Vienna
Austrian footballers
Austria youth international footballers
FK Austria Wien players
VfB Stuttgart II players
Austrian Football Bundesliga players
2. Liga (Austria) players
Regionalliga players
Association football wingers
Austrian expatriate footballers
Austrian expatriates in Germany
Expatriate footballers in Germany